Poynton is a surname. Notable people with the surname include:

 Adrian Poynton, British writer and comedian 
 Alexander Poynton (1853–1935), Australian politician
 Arthur Blackburne Poynton (1867–1944), British classical scholar
 Sir Arthur Hilton Poynton (1905–1996), British civil servant
 Cecil Poynton (1901–1983), soccer player
 Charles Poynton (born 1950), Canadian technical consultant and writer
 Dorothy Poynton-Hill (1915–1995), American diver
 Harold Poynton, English rugby league footballer who played in the 1950s and 1960s
 Deborah Poynton (born 1970), South African painter
 Thomas Poynton (born 1989), English cricketer
 Tommy Poynton, English rugby league footballer who played in the 1900s and 1910s